The 2018 Nuneaton and Bedworth Borough Council election was held on 3 May 2018, as part of 2018 United Kingdom local elections. Half of the council was up for election and the Labour Party lost overall control of the council to no overall control.

Election results

2018 Election 

.

Council make up 
Total number of seats on the Council after the elections:

Ward results 

Changes shown compared to the 2014 Nuneaton and Bedworth Borough Council election, when these seats were last contested. Swing figures are calculated between the winning candidate and the candidate in second place. Turnout figures include invalid ballots, therefore they may differ from total votes cast for all candidates.

Abbey

Arbury

Attleborough

Barpool

Bede

Bulkington

Camp Hill

Exhall Ward

Galley Common Ward

Heath Ward

Kingswood Ward

Poplar Ward

Slough Ward

St. Nicolas Ward

Weddington Ward

Wem Brook Ward

Whitestone Ward

References 

2018 English local elections
Nuneaton and Bedworth Borough Council elections